Maria Magdalena, Archduchess of Austria (Maria Magdalena Josefa; 26 March 1689 – 1 May 1743) was a governor of Tyrol and daughter of Emperor Leopold I and his third wife Eleonore Magdalene of the Palatinate. She died unmarried.

Biography

Born at the Hofburg Palace in Vienna she was the ninth child of Emperor Leopold I and Eleonore Magdalene of the Palatinate. Shortly before the War of the Spanish Succession, there was the question of the new king of Spain, Philip V of Spain, marrying the archduchess, but Louis XIV of France was opposed to this match for political reasons, and the official reason given was that none of the archduchesses offered pleased his grandson. In 1708, her older sister  Archduchess Maria Anna married John V of Portugal; plans for a second union between Austria and Portugal were discussed when Maria Magdalena was proposed as a bride for Infante Francis, Duke of Beja, brother of John V. Negotiations failed in the early stages and, as such, both candidates died unmarried. Again after the war the question of her becoming queen of Spain to replace the now deceased Luisa Maria of Savoy was floated. However, again it came to naught and Philip married Elisabeth Farnese instead.

After the failed marriage, she lived a life of seclusion and remained unmarried and died without issue. She had a close relationship to her niece Maria Theresa, the daughter of her brother Emperor Charles VI and future Empress and also with her sister Archduchess Maria Anna. She died of pneumonia at the age of 54. She was buried at the Imperial Crypts in Vienna.

Ancestors

References 

1689 births
1743 deaths
17th-century House of Habsburg
18th-century House of Habsburg
17th-century Austrian women
18th-century Austrian women
Austrian princesses
Burials at the Imperial Crypt
Deaths from pneumonia in Austria
Daughters of emperors
Governors of Tyrol
Children of Leopold I, Holy Roman Emperor
Nobility from Vienna
Daughters of kings